The Malajpur Temple located in the Malajpur(region) near Chicholi in Betul,  madhya pradesh, India. The only Ghost fair in the world. every year on the occasion of vashant panchami a fair is conducted on the Tombstone of Hindu Saint "Gurusahab Baba". Where people comes  from across the india.

History

In Malajpur village of Betul, ghosts and ghosts inside the body of people allegedly talk and also give interviews. In fact, in the village of Malajpur, there is the tomb of a saint named Gurusahab Baba, where the fair of ghosts has been started continuously for the last 305 years. Here, alleged ghosts are treated.

The fair at the Samadhi Sthal begins every year on the day of Magha Purnima. People who have an illusion that an evil spirit or vampire has entered their body come to this fair to get rid of them. But A Bhoot Phantom is not only seen dancing and swinging but also giving interviews.

Timeline 

The fair at the Samadhi Sthal begins every year on the day of Magha Purnima. People who have an illusion that an evil spirit or vampire has entered their body come to this fair to get rid of them. But A Bhoot Phantom is not only seen dancing and swinging but also giving interviews.

Population

Mlajpur is a large village located in Chicholi Tehsil of Betul district, Madhya Pradesh with total 601 families residing. The Mlajpur village has population of 2765 of which 1372 are males while 1393 are females as per Population Census 2011.

In Mlajpur village population of children with age 0-6 is 406 which makes up 14.68 % of total population of village. Average Sex Ratio of Mlajpur village is 1015 which is higher than Madhya Pradesh state average of 931. Child Sex Ratio for the Mlajpur as per census is 980, higher than Madhya Pradesh average of 918.

Mlajpur village has higher literacy rate compared to Madhya Pradesh. In 2011, literacy rate of Mlajpur village was 71.05 % compared to 69.32 % of Madhya Pradesh. In Mlajpur Male literacy stands at 83.29 % while female literacy rate was 59.06 %.

As per constitution of India and Panchyati Raaj Act, Mlajpur village is administrated by Sarpanch (Head of Village) who is elected representative of village. Our website, don't have information about schools and hospital in Mlajpur village.

Reference 

Temples in Madhya Pradesh
Betul district